Barry Harris at the Jazz Workshop is a live album by pianist Barry Harris recorded in San Francisco in 1960 and released on the Riverside label.

Reception

Allmusic awarded the album 4 stars with its review by Scott Yanow stating, "Pianist Barry Harris' second recording as a leader (he led a set for Argo in 1958) finds him at the age of 30 playing in the same boppish style he would have throughout his career".

Track listing 
All compositions by Barry Harris except as indicated
 "Is You Is or Is You Ain't My Baby" (Bill Austin, Louis Jordan) - 5:31
 "Curtain Call" - 3:45  
 "Star Eyes" (Gene de Paul, Don Raye) - 4:42  
 "Moose the Mooche" (Charlie Parker) - 6:13  
 "Lolita" - 3:59  
 "Morning Coffee" - 4:52  
 "Don't Blame Me" (Jimmy McHugh, Dorothy Fields) - 5:08  
 "Woody 'n' You" (Dizzy Gillespie) - 4:43

Personnel 
Barry Harris - piano
Sam Jones - bass
Louis Hayes - drums

References 

Barry Harris live albums
1960 live albums
Riverside Records live albums
Albums produced by Orrin Keepnews
Albums recorded at the Jazz Workshop